Ankoko Island is an island located at the confluence of the Cuyuni River and Wenamu River, at , on the border between Venezuela and the disputed area of Guayana Esequiba.

Venezuela, which claims Guayana Esequiba as part of its territory, established a military base on the island in 1966, which Guyana claims as intrusion and aggression on a territory whose sovereignty was never under discussion.

History

Venezuelan occupation 
In February 1966, the governments of Venezuela, the United Kingdom and Guyana signed the Geneva Agreement aimed at resolving the controversy over the Guayana Esequiba territorial dispute.

Five months after Guyana's independence from the United Kingdom, Venezuelan troops began their occupation of Ankoko Island and surrounding islands in October 1966. Venezuelan troops quickly constructed military installations and an airstrip. 

Subsequently, on the morning of the 14 October 1966, Forbes Burnham, as Prime Minister and Minister of External Affairs of Guyana, dispatched a protest to the Foreign Minister of Venezuela, demanding the immediate withdrawal of Venezuelan troops and the removal of installations they had established. Venezuelan minister Ignacio Iribarren Borges replied stating "the Government of Venezuela rejects the aforementioned protest, because Anacoco Island is Venezuelan territory in its entirety and the Republic of Venezuela has always been in possession of it". The island remains under Venezuelan administration, where a Venezuelan airport and a military base operate.

Recent history 
During the Venezuelan presidential crisis, interim president Juan Guaidó and the National Assembly of Venezuela renewed territory disputes with Guyana regarding sovereignty of the island. Specifically when National Assembly deputies visited the island "as an act of ratification of Venezuelan sovereignty over the area".

See also
Guayana Esequiba
British Guiana
Corocoro Island
Güepí

References 

River islands of Venezuela
Territorial disputes of Venezuela
Territorial disputes of Guyana
International islands